The  is a city tram station on the Takaoka Kidō Line located in Takaoka, Toyama Prefecture, Japan. The station is sometimes called .

Surrounding area

Takaoka Daibutsu (Great Buddha statue)

Railway stations in Toyama Prefecture